Clark Fork is a stream in Cooper County in the U.S. state of Missouri. It is a tributary of Petite Saline Creek.

The stream flows to the northeast and north passing under Missouri Route 87 approximately one mile northwest of the community of Clarks Fork. The confluence is approximately 4.5 miles southeast of Booneville.

Clark Fork bears the name of a pioneer settler.

See also
List of rivers of Missouri

References

Rivers of Cooper County, Missouri
Rivers of Missouri